Nui FC is a Tuvaluan football club from Nui that plays in the Tuvalu A-Division. It was formed in 1980. 

The team's home ground is the Tuvalu Sports Ground, the only football field in Tuvalu. Nui plays on an amateur level, as do all the teams in Tuvalu.

Current squad
As of 5 July 2012.

Honours

Cup
NBT Cup
Runners-up (1): 2010
Independence Cup for Outer Islands Teams
Runners-up (1): 2008

References

External links
 Dutch Support Tuvalu Official Website
 TNFA Official Website

Nui (atoll)
Football clubs in Tuvalu
1980 establishments in Tuvalu
Association football clubs established in 1980